Events in the year 1961 in Cyprus.

Incumbents 

 President: Makarios III
 President of the Parliament: Glafcos Clerides

Events 

March - Cyprus became a republic in the Commonwealth of Nations at the 1961 Commonwealth Prime Ministers' Conference, and President Makarios III became a Commonwealth Head of State & a Commonwealth Head of Government as a result.

 The Cypriot Chess Championship joined FIDE.

Deaths

References 

 
1960s in Cyprus
Years of the 21st century in Cyprus
Cyprus
Cyprus
Cyprus